Berre-l'Étang is a commune in the Bouches-du-Rhône department in the Provence-Alpes-Côte d'Azur region in southern France.

Population

See also
 Étang de Berre
 Communes of the Bouches-du-Rhône department

References

Communes of Bouches-du-Rhône
Bouches-du-Rhône communes articles needing translation from French Wikipedia